French election, 2017 may refer to:

 2017 French presidential election
 2017 French legislative election